Ashestan (also Romanized as Āshestān; also known as Āshīstān) is a village in Gonbar Rural District, in the Central District of Osku County, East Azerbaijan Province, Iran. At the 2006 census, its population was 146, in 33 families.

References 

Populated places in Osku County